CITU-FM is a Canadian radio station which broadcasts a French language community radio format on the frequency 104.1 FM in Petit-de-Grat, Nova Scotia.

Owned by La Co-opérative Radio Richmond limitée, the station received Canadian Radio-television and Telecommunications Commission (CRTC) approval on March 15, 2006.

The station's former callsign was CIZO-FM. It was changed in 2009.

The station is a member of the Alliance des radios communautaires du Canada.

References

External links
CITU-FM history - Canadian Communication Foundation

Itu
Itu
Itu
Radio stations established in 2006
2006 establishments in Nova Scotia